Robert H. "Bob" Kyle (c. 1870 – after 1928) was an Irish football manager during the 1900s, 1910s and 1920s.

A native of Belfast, Kyle was club secretary (overseeing the whole club including coaching/training) at Distillery in the Irish League from June 1897 to 1905.  During this time "the Whites" claimed three League titles, two Irish Cups, one City Cup, three County Antrim Shields and one Belfast Charity Cup.

Kyle was invited to become secretary-manager at Sunderland in August 1905, remaining in the role until retiring on 15 March 1928. He thus remains Sunderland's longest serving manager.  During Kyle's time in charge Sunderland claimed the Football League title in 1913 and finished as runners-up in 1923. He is the only Irish manager ever to win the English top division.

Managerial stats
As of 16 September 2007.

See also 
 List of English football championship-winning managers

Notes

Sunderland A.F.C. managers
Sportspeople from Belfast
1870s births
Year of death missing
Date of birth missing
Place of death missing
Football managers from Northern Ireland